Cabrini is an Italian surname. Notable people with the surname include:

Antonio Cabrini (born 1957), Italian footballer and coach
Frances Xavier Cabrini (1850–1917), Italian-American nun

See also
 Named after Frances Xavier Cabrini:
Cabrini Boulevard, Manhattan
Cabrini High School (disambiguation)
Cabrini Medical Center, Manhattan
Cabrini University, Philadelphia
Cabrini–Green Homes, a closed housing project in Chicago

Italian-language surnames